Remote Survival is an American television reality competition series produced by Eyeworks USA Productions that premiered on the National Geographic Channel on January 11, 2015. The series is executive produced by DJ Nurre, and Vince DiPersio.

Series overview 
Four episodes document the survivalists' experiences while being guided by the experts, Hodges and Coker.  Two of the episodes take place in the coastal rainforest of Washington State, the other two are set in the desert regions of Southern Utah.

Cast

Hosts

 Cliff Hodges 
 Alex Coker

Survivors

Each episode features two new 'Remote Survivors', or contestants. One is guided by Cliff Hodges, the other by Alex Coker. Contestants must follow the experts' instruction to travel from a drop point to an extraction point of a period of several days (exact length unspecified) while performing various survival skills along the way. Contestants have the option to be evacuated at any time by using an emergency GPS transponder located on their shoulder strap.

References

External links
 

2010s American reality television series
2015 American television series debuts
English-language television shows
National Geographic (American TV channel) original programming
Television shows filmed in Utah
Television shows filmed in Washington (state)